Escuadro could refer to one of the following locations in Spain
 Escuadro (Zamora, Spain)
 Escuadro (Pontevedra, Spain)